Li Long (born 23 January 1998) is a Chinese footballer of Korean descent who currently plays for China League One side Kunshan FC.

Club career
Li Long was promoted to the Chinese Super League side Yanbian Funde's first team squad in the 2017 season. On 29 April 2017, he made his senior debut in a 1–0 home win against Changchun Yatai as the benefit of the new rule of the league that at least one Under-23 player must be in the starting line-up and was substituted off in the 11th minute.

On 21 February 2019, Li transferred to Chinese Super League side Guangzhou R&F. He was not included in the first team and was freely allowed to join third tier club Kunshan FC on 26 June 2019.

Personal life
Li Long's twin brother Li Qiang is also a footballer who plays for Yanbian's reserve team.

Career statistics
.

References

External links
 

1998 births
Living people
Chinese footballers
Association football defenders
People from Yanbian
Yanbian Funde F.C. players
Guangzhou City F.C. players
Kunshan F.C. players
Chinese Super League players
China League One players
China League Two players
Chinese people of Korean descent
Footballers from Jilin
Twin sportspeople
Chinese twins